Marloes Coenen (born March 31, 1981) is a retired Dutch mixed martial artist. She competed professionally from 2000 to 2017 and is a former Strikeforce Women's Bantamweight Champion.

Early life
Coenen's brothers and grandfather were both involved in martial arts, with the latter having trained in jiu-jitsu, and this aided Coenen with her own transition into the sport.

She began training with Pierre Drachman and Martijn de Jong at Shooto Holland while only 14, who recalls that, "I really had respect for that, because it didn't matter if it rained or snowed. She still kept on coming."  She started martial arts training because she had to bicycle alone through a lonely part of the forest to and from school, and she had heard rumors that there were "dirty men in the forest" who preyed on girls.

Along with her competitive career, Coenen is planning to study Communications Sciences in Amsterdam with a goal of future employment in that sector. She was appointed to the municipal advisory council Sportraad Amsterdam and is the city´s ambassador for martial arts.

Mixed martial arts career
Coenen debuted in mixed martial arts in November 2000 and scored eight consecutive victories, winning the 2000 ReMix World Cup along the way. This was the first female MMA championship making her the first ever female MMA champion.

Prior to a 2004 fight with Erin Toughill, Coenen was alleged to have referred to Toughill as the "personification of arrogance." However, she later confirmed that no such statements were made, and has mostly positive things to say about Toughill.

She later advanced to the finals of the 2007 K-GRACE tournament, but lost to Roxanne Modafferi by split decision.

Coenen signed a contract with Elite XC shortly before the promotion folded in 2008, but did not receive a chance to compete before its closure.

Strikeforce
Following Strikeforce: Carano vs. Cyborg on August 15, 2009, it was announced that Coenen would likely be the first challenger for new Strikeforce Women's Featherweight Champion Cris Cyborg.

Coenen, who was in attendance at the post-fight press conference, later addressed the proposed fight with Cyborg and other potential fights under the Strikeforce banner.

However, Cyborg suffered an injury and Coenen was then set to compete in a rematch with Toughill at Strikeforce: Fedor vs. Rogers to determine the first title challenger.

On October 27, 2009, Toughill withdrew from the fight due to an undisclosed medical condition, but Coenen still competed on the card in a rematch against Roxanne Modafferi. She defeated Modafferi by armbar submission in the first round.

Coenen challenged for Cyborg's title at Strikeforce: Miami on January 30, 2010. She lost the fight by TKO in the third round.

Coenen expressed a desire to fight again for Strikeforce on June 26, 2010, but Strikeforce CEO Scott Coker confirmed that Coenen would not be competing on the card.

Coenen was invited to take part in the August 2010 Strikeforce women's tournament at 135 pounds and verbally agreed to participate. However, on July 10, 2010, it was confirmed that she was no longer scheduled to be part of the tournament.

On July 22, 2010, Strikeforce announced that Coenen would drop down to 135 pounds to face Sarah Kaufman for the Strikeforce Women's Bantamweight Championship. Coenen was named the number one contender for the title, while the winner of the Strikeforce 135-pound one-night tournament, Miesha Tate, will assume the number two contender spot behind Coenen.

She will continue to compete at 145 pounds as well and Strikeforce had planned to set up a rematch between Coenen and Cindy Dandois sometime in 2010. On August 19, 2010, it was reported that the rematch was off.

Coenen faced Sarah Kaufman for the Strikeforce Women's Bantamweight Championship on October 9, 2010 in San Jose, California. Coenen won the fight by submission due to an armbar in the third round to become Women's Bantamweight Champion (135 lbs).

She was also scheduled to compete one week later at Ultimate Glory 12 on October 16, 2010 in Amsterdam, Holland against Lena Buytendijk. However, it was announced during the event that the fight had been cancelled.

Coenen was scheduled to defend her Strikeforce title against Miesha Tate at Strikeforce: Feijao vs. Henderson on March 5, 2011. Tate was forced off the card due to injury. Liz Carmouche stepped in on short notice to face Coenen for the title. Coenen defeated Carmouche via triangle choke in the fourth round.

Coenen defended her title against Miesha Tate at Strikeforce: Fedor vs. Henderson on July 30, 2011 and lost via submission due to an arm-triangle choke in the fourth round. This was the first time that Coenen had been submitted in MMA. Prior to the bout, Zuffa management changed the name of Coenen's title from Welterweight to Bantamweight in order to keep all weight classes the same.

On August 3, 2011, Golden Glory announced that Coenen had been released from her contract by Strikeforce.

Invicta FC and Dream
On August 26, 2011, Coenen announced that she had signed a three-fight, non-exclusive deal with North Carolina-based organization BlackEye Promotions for a February 2012 debut. However, Coenen remained under a verbal agreement with the promotion only and did not in fact sign a contract. She instead signed on as the first contracted athlete to Invicta Fighting Championships. Coenen returned to 145 pounds to headline the first all-female Invicta Fighting Championships card against Romy Ruyssen on April 28, 2012 in Kansas City, Kansas. She defeated Ruyssen by unanimous decision.

Coenen faced Fiona Muxlow at Dream 18 on December 31, 2012. She defeated Muxlow by armbar submission in the first round.

Coenen faced Cris Cyborg in a rematch for the inaugural Invicta FC Featherweight Championship at Invicta FC 6: Coenen vs. Cyborg on July 13, 2013. Cyborg defeated Coenen again via TKO in the fourth round to become the first Invicta FC Featherweight Champion.

Bellator MMA
In August 2014, it was announced that Bellator had signed Marloes Coenen.

Coenen made her debut against Annalisa Bucci on October 24, 2014 at Bellator 130. She won the fight via submission in the third round.

She was set to face Julia Budd for the inaugural Bellator Woman's Featherweight Championship at Bellator 155, however Budd pulled out due to injury and was replaced by Alexis Dufresne, making the bout no longer for the title. Coenen lost the bout via submission in the first round.

Coenen was scheduled to face Talita Nogueira at Bellator 163 but the bout was cancelled the day before the event when Talita failed to make weight.

Coenen faced Julia Budd for Bellator's inaugural women's featherweight championship, at Bellator 174 on March 3, 2017. Coenen lost the fight via TKO in the fourth round and subsequently announced her retirement from MMA after the fight.

Mixed martial arts record

|-
| Loss
| align=center| 23–8
| Julia Budd
| TKO (punches)
| Bellator 174
| 
| align=center| 4
| align=center| 2:42
| Thackerville, Oklahoma, United States
| |
|-
| Loss
| align=center| 23–7
| Alexis Dufresne
| Submission (triangle armbar)
| Bellator 155
| 
| align=center| 1
| align=center| 4:33
| Boise, Idaho, United States
| |
|-
| Win
| align=center| 23–6
| Arlene Blencowe
| Submission (armbar)
| Bellator 141
| 
| align=center| 2
| align=center| 3:23
| Temecula, California, United States
|
|-
| Win
| align=center| 22–6
| Annalisa Bucci
| Submission (rear-naked choke)
| Bellator 130
| 
| align=center| 3
| align=center| 0:57
| Mulvane, Kansas, United States
| 
|-
| Loss
| align=center| 21–6
| Cris Cyborg
| TKO (punches and elbows)
| Invicta FC 6: Coenen vs. Cyborg
| 
| align=center| 4
| align=center| 4:02
| Kansas City, Missouri, United States
| . 
|-
| Win
| align=center| 21–5
| Fiona Muxlow
| Submission (armbar)
| Dream 18
| 
| align=center| 1
| align=center| 3:29
| Saitama, Japan
| 
|-
| Win
| align=center| 20–5
| Romy Ruyssen
| Decision (unanimous)
| Invicta FC 1: Coenen vs. Ruyssen
| 
| align=center| 3
| align=center| 5:00
| Kansas City, Kansas, United States
| 
|-
| Loss
| align=center| 19–5
| Miesha Tate
| Submission (arm-triangle choke)
| Strikeforce: Fedor vs. Henderson
| 
| align=center| 4
| align=center| 3:03
| Hoffman Estates, Illinois, United States
| .
|-
| Win
| align=center| 19–4
| Liz Carmouche
| Submission (triangle choke)
| Strikeforce: Feijao vs. Henderson
| 
| align=center| 4
| align=center| 1:29
| Columbus, Ohio, United States
| .
|-
| Win
| align=center| 18–4
| Sarah Kaufman
| Submission (armbar)
| Strikeforce: San Jose
| 
| align=center| 3
| align=center| 1:59
| San Jose, California, United States
| .
|-
| Loss
| align=center| 17–4
| Cris Cyborg
| TKO (punches)
| Strikeforce: Miami
| 
| align=center| 3
| align=center| 3:40
| Sunrise, Florida, United States
| .
|-
| Win
| align=center| 17–3
| Roxanne Modafferi
| Submission (armbar)
| Strikeforce: Fedor vs. Rogers
| 
| align=center| 1
| align=center| 1:05
| Hoffman Estates, Illinois, United States
| 
|-
| Loss
| align=center| 16–3
| Cindy Dandois
| Decision (unanimous)
| Beast of the East
| 
| align=center| 3
| align=center| 5:00
| Zutphen, Netherlands
| 
|-
| Win
| align=center| 16–2
| Asci Kubra
| TKO (punches)
| KOE: Tough Is Not Enough
| 
| align=center| 1
| align=center| 1:51
| Rotterdam, Netherlands
| 
|-
| Win
| align=center| 15–2
| Romy Ruyssen
| Submission (rear-naked choke)
| SLV 3: Thaibox Gala Night
| 
| align=center| 2
| align=center| 4:45
| Basel, Switzerland
| 
|-
| Win
| align=center| 14–2
| Asci Kubra
| Submission (armbar)
| Beast of the East
| 
| align=center| 1
| align=center| N/A
| Zutphen, Netherlands
| 
|-
| Loss
| align=center| 13–2
| Roxanne Modafferi
| Decision (split)
| K-Grace 1
| 
| align=center| 2
| align=center| 3:00
| Tokyo, Japan
| 
|-
| Win
| align=center| 13–1
| Magdalena Jarecka
| Submission (rear-naked choke)
| K-Grace 1
| 
| align=center| 2
| align=center| 1:35
| Tokyo, Japan
| 
|-
| Win
| align=center| 12–1
| Keiko Tamai
| Submission (rear-naked choke)
| K-Grace 1
| 
| align=center| 1
| align=center| 2:01
| Tokyo, Japan
| 
|-
| Win
| align=center| 11–1
| Majanka Lathouwers
| Submission (armbar)
| Shooto Holland: Ultimate Glory 2
| 
| align=center| 2
| align=center| 3:10
| Utrecht, Netherlands
| 
|-
| Win
| align=center| 10–1
| Yoko Takahashi
| Submission (armbar)
| G-Shooto: G-Shooto 04
| 
| align=center| 1
| align=center| 0:39
| Tokyo, Japan
| 
|-
| Win
| align=center| 9–1
| Yuuki Kondo
| KO (punch)
| Smackgirl: Cool Fighter's Last Stand
| 
| align=center| 2
| align=center| 0:50
| Shizuoka Prefecture, Japan
| 
|-
| Loss
| align=center| 8–1
| Erin Toughill
| KO (punch)
| Smackgirl: World ReMix 2004
| 
| align=center| 1
| align=center| 5:00
| Shizuoka Prefecture, Japan
| 
|-
| Win
| align=center| 8–0
| Yoko Takahashi
| TKO (punches)
| Smackgirl: World ReMix 2004
| 
| align=center| 1
| align=center| 2:30
| Shizuoka Prefecture, Japan
| 
|-
| Win
| align=center| 7–0
| Miwako Ishihara
| Decision (majority)
| Shooto: Wanna Shooto 2002
| 
| align=center| 2
| align=center| 5:00
| Tokyo, Japan
| 
|-
| Win
| align=center| 6–0
| Megumi Yabushita
| Submission (rear-naked choke)
| Jd': No Holds Barred
| 
| align=center| 1
| align=center| 2:27
| Tokyo, Japan
| 
|-
| Win
| align=center| 5–0
| Yoko Takahashi
| Submission (armbar)
| ReMix: Golden Gate 2001
| 
| align=center| 1
| align=center| 1:11
| Japan
| 
|-
| Win
| align=center| 4–0
| Megumi Yabushita
| Decision (unanimous)
| ReMix: World Cup 2000
| 
| align=center| 3
| align=center| 5:00
| Nippon Budokan, Japan
| 
|-
| Win
| align=center| 3–0
| Becky Levi
| Submission (flying armbar)
| ReMix: World Cup 2000
| 
| align=center| 1
| align=center| 1:25
| Nippon Budokan, Japan
| 
|-
| Win
| align=center| 2–0
| Mika Harigai
| Submission (rear-naked choke)
| ReMix: World Cup 2000
| 
| align=center| 1
| align=center| 0:31
| Nippon Budokan, Japan
| 
|-
| Win
| align=center| 1–0
| Yuuki Kondo
| Submission (armbar)
| LLPW – L-1 2000: The Strongest Lady
| 
| align=center| 1
| align=center| 2:37
| Tokyo, Japan
|

Championships
Strikeforce 
Strikeforce Women's Bantamweight Championship (One time)
One successful title defense 

Grappling
 Dutch Brazilian Jiu-Jitsu Champion
 2000 ReMix World Cup Champion
 2007 ADCC Bronze - Women's Under 67 kg

See also
 List of female mixed martial artists

References

External links
 Marloes Coenen at Invicta FC
 
 Marloes Coenen at AwakeningFighters.com
 

1981 births
Living people
People from Olst
Dutch female mixed martial artists
Bantamweight mixed martial artists
Featherweight mixed martial artists
Mixed martial artists utilizing Muay Thai
Mixed martial artists utilizing freestyle wrestling
Mixed martial artists utilizing Brazilian jiu-jitsu
Strikeforce (mixed martial arts) champions
Dutch Muay Thai practitioners
Female Muay Thai practitioners
Dutch female sport wrestlers
Dutch practitioners of Brazilian jiu-jitsu
Female Brazilian jiu-jitsu practitioners
Sportspeople from Overijssel